Bryant Smith (born October 21, 1977) is a former American professional basketball player who played college basketball for Oklahoma City

References

External links

1977 births
Living people
American expatriate basketball people in North Macedonia
Centers (basketball)
KK MZT Skopje players
Oklahoma City Stars men's basketball players
Power forwards (basketball)
Place of birth missing (living people)
American men's basketball players